Serbian Orthodox Cathedral in Prizren may refer to:

 Serbian Orthodox Cathedral of the Holy Mother of God in Prizren, former cathedral of the Serbian Orthodox Eparchy of Prizren, from 13th to 18th century; see Our Lady of Ljeviš Orthodox Cathedral
 Serbian Orthodox Cathedral of Saint George in Prizren, modern cathedral of the Serbian Orthodox Eparchy of Raška and Prizren, since 1887

See also 
 Cathedral (disambiguation)